Events from the year 1828 in Denmark.

Incumbents
 Monarch – Frederick VI
 Prime minister – Otto Joachim

Events

Undated

Births
 2 May – Jacob Heinrich Moresco, businessman (died 1906)
 8 November – Johannes Helms, writer and schoolmaster (died 1895)
 30 November – Carl Simonsen, printmaker (died 1902)

Deaths
 11 February – Hans Hansen, portrait painter (born 1769)
 April 3 – Andreas Hallander, architect and master builder (born 1755)
 8 May – Christian August Lorentzen, painter (born 1749)

References

 
1820s in Denmark
Denmark
Years of the 19th century in Denmark